Joey Ansah (born 24 November 1982) is a British actor, director and martial artist best known for his roles in The Bourne Ultimatum (2007), Street Fighter: Assassin's Fist (2014) and The Old Guard (2020).

Early life and education
Joey Ansah was born in London borough of Hackney, London, England, of mixed ethnicity, the second son of celebrated Ghanaian fashion designer Kofi Ansah and his Devon-born wife Nicola. His sister is the visual artist Tanoa Sasraku-Ansah and his brother is musician Ryan Ansah. His uncle is film director Kwaw Ansah.

Ansah lived in London for the first 10 years of his life before emigrating with his family to Ghana. There he studied the martial art of Taekwondo for four years and took up hip-hop dance and motorbike racing. At 15 he returned to England, settling with his mother and young sister in Plymouth. While studying for his GCSEs and A-levels at Devonport High School for Boys, he began training in the martial art of Ninpo Taijutsu and eventually earned a black belt in the art. This would include a period of training with Bujinkan Grandmaster Masaaki Hatsumi. Later, while studying for his degree in human biology at Oxford Brookes University, he began training in the Brazilian martial art of Capoeira. He also worked as a model and extra.

Career
His first important role as an actor was in the UK indie film Love Struck (2005). Notable appearances on British TV followed in episodes of BBC productions Spooks (2005) and Timewatch (2006).

Ansah went on to play a minor role as one of the Shadow Warriors in Batman Begins (2005). However, his most noteworthy role to date came in 2007, when he appeared in The Bourne Ultimatum as Desh Bouksani, an assassin tracking down Jason Bourne. Ansah's performance was notable for an extended set-piece fight scene between himself and Matt Damon, regarded by one reviewer as one of the best ever filmed, in which Ansah performed all of his own stunts. In 2008 he was nominated for an MTV Film Award in the "Best Fight" category.

Ansah has also acted in British independent martial arts films, such as Left for Dead (2004) and Underground (2007).

He choreographed, co-wrote and directed the 2014 short film Street Fighter: Legacy. A self-proclaimed fan of the video game series, Ansah wanted the short to be the most accurate depiction of the series, different from the two theatrically released films. He and collaborator Christian Howard, with whom he worked on SFL, worked on the live-action Street Fighter series Street Fighter: Assassin's Fist, and they are developing a second season titled Street Fighter: World Warrior and Street Fighter: Resurrection.

Filmography
 Left for Dead (2005) – Kickboxer 1
 Batman Begins (2005) as League of Shadows member
 Love Struck (2005) – Mango
 Voyage: Killing Brigitte Nielsen (2007) (TV)
 The Bourne Ultimatum (2007) – Desh Bouksani
 Underground (2007) – Joey, The Model
 Ghost Town (2009) (TV) – Bonesera
 Hit Girls (2009) – James
 Street Fighter: Legacy (2010) – Akuma, also co-writer and co-director
 Knock Out (2010)
 Attack the Block (2011) – Policeman 1
 Snow White and the Huntsman (2012) – Aldan 
 UFO (2013) – Police Officer / Black Ops Soldier
 The Numbers Station (2013) – Derne
 Green Street 3: Never Back Down (2013) – Victor
 Street Fighter: Assassin's Fist (2014) – Akuma, also co-creator
 Street Fighter: Resurrection (2016)
 Mission: Impossible – Fallout (2018)
 The Old Guard (2020) - Keane

Awards and nominations

References

External links
Official Joey Ansah website

1982 births
Alumni of Oxford Brookes University
English male film actors
English film directors
English people of Ghanaian descent
English capoeira practitioners
British stunt performers
English male taekwondo practitioners
Living people
English ninjutsu practitioners
Male actors from London
Black British male actors
People educated at Devonport High School for Boys